St. Mary's Catholic School is a private Roman Catholic high school in Longview, Texas.  It is located in the Roman Catholic Diocese of Tyler.

Values
Faith: Growth in knowledge and spirituality; appreciation of values and a capacity for right judgement
Scholarship: Application of intellectual skills such as critical thinking, problem solving and understanding; development of each student's individual academic potential
Leadership: Learn wise use of leisure time; discover and develop imagination, originality and creative abilities; practice the principles of democratic living; learn to work with others
Service: Giving witness to the faith by putting love into action; forming a social conscience with a zeal for the common good

Sports  and competitions 
St. Mary's Catholic School students compete in Soccer, Volleyball, Softball, Track, Cross Country, Golf, and Tennis [added 2020] through the Texas Association of Private and Public School (TAPPS). St. Mary's Catholic School students also compete in Archery through National Archery In The Schools Program (NASP). St. Mary's Catholic School students can compete in TAPPS academics, and TAPPS art.

References

External links
 St. Mary's Catholic School website

Catholic secondary schools in Texas
Schools in Gregg County, Texas
Educational institutions established in 1948
Private K-12 schools in Texas
1948 establishments in Texas